Eiichi Nakamura (Japanese: 中村 英一, Nakamura Eiichi; 1909 – 27 May 1945) was a Japanese athlete and field hockey player from Kyoto Prefecture. Nakamura is best known for competing in the 1932 Summer Olympics.

Nakamura was a member of the Japanese field hockey team, which won the silver medal at the 1932 Summer Olympics in Los Angeles, California.

He was killed in action during World War II.

References

External links
 
profile

1909 births
1945 deaths
Sportspeople from Kyoto Prefecture
Japanese male field hockey players
Olympic field hockey players of Japan
Field hockey players at the 1932 Summer Olympics
Olympic silver medalists for Japan
Olympic medalists in field hockey
Medalists at the 1932 Summer Olympics
Deaths by airstrike during World War II
Deaths by American airstrikes
Japanese military personnel killed in World War II
20th-century Japanese people